Bryant Mbamalu (born December 11, 1991) is an American-born Nigerian basketball player currently with the Club Deportivo Valdivia of the Liga Nacional de Básquetbol de Chile.

In the past, he played for the Lagos Warriors.

National team Career 
Mbamalu has been a member of the Nigerian national team and he participated at the AfroBasket 2017.

References

External links
Louisiana-Lafayette Ragin' Cajuns bio

1991 births
Living people
American expatriate basketball people in Chile
Basketball players from Houston
Louisiana Ragin' Cajuns men's basketball players
Nigerian men's basketball players
Shooting guards
American men's basketball players